CKSG-FM is a Canadian radio station being licensed to Cobourg, Ontario serving the Northumberland and Peterborough region broadcasting at 93.3 FM. The station broadcasts an adult contemporary format branded as 93.3 myFM.

The station was launched in 2002 by Pineridge Broadcasting which, at the time, also owned CHUC-FM and CJWV-FM. On September 1, 2015, My Broadcasting Corporation purchased Pineridge Broadcasting Inc.

The station was a Canadian Top 40 reporter on Nielsen BDS and Mediabase 24/7 on their Canadian Top 40 panel.

History

The station officially launched with a hot adult contemporary/top 40 format under the brand name Star 93.3 in 2002. On March 7, 2016, at Noon, the station rebranded to 93.3 myFM, and flipped to an adult contemporary format.

References

External links
93.3 myFM

Ksg
Ksg
Radio stations established in 2002
2002 establishments in Ontario
KSG